Myron Plato Lindsley (September 18, 1825January 16, 1883) was an American attorney and Democratic politician.  He was the 10th Mayor of Green Bay, Wisconsin, and represented Green Bay for two years in the Wisconsin State Senate.

Biography
Lindsley was born in Rushville, New York, and raised on his family's farm in Yates County.  He graduated from Union College in Schenectady, New York, in 1849.  He went on to study law at John W. Fowler's Law School at Ballston Spa, New York, and graduated in 1850.

He came to Wisconsin later that year and settled at Green Bay, where he established a legal practice.  His practice soon grew to include real estate and collections.

He became involved in local politics and was elected to his first two-year term as County Clerk of Brown County in 1854.  He was subsequently elected again in 1860, and reelected in 1862, 1864, and 1866.  In April 1865, concurrent with his time as Clerk, he was elected Mayor of Green Bay, serving one year.

In 1871, he was elected on the Democratic Party ticket to represent Brown County in the Wisconsin State Senate.

The next year, in the 1872 election, he was the Democratic nominee for United States House of Representatives in Wisconsin's 6th congressional district.  He was defeated in that race by incumbent Philetus Sawyer.

Personal life and family
Lindsley married Frances A. Ingalls in 1854.  Together they had two children, Thales and Lelia Elizabeth ("Lizzie").

Thales enlisted in the United States Army for the Spanish–American War and was stationed in Manila.  He remained in the Philippines for the rest of his life, working for the American administration there.

Lizzie married Frank B. Desnoyers, who would also serve as mayor of Green Bay.  Frank was the son of Francis X. Desnoyers, who was also a former mayor of Green Bay.

He was active in the Presbyterian church and was superintendent of the sunday school.  He was also a prominent member of the Independent Order of Odd Fellows—he was Grand Master of Wisconsin for two terms and Grand Representative to the Sovereign Grand Lodge.

Lindlsey suffered from digestive issues for several years, and found his condition badly exacerbated during a trip to Grand Forks, Dakota Territory, where he was investigating a speculative land deal.  On his way back to Green Bay, he stopped to rest in Madison, Wisconsin, where he died at the home of fellow Odd Fellow L. B. Hills.

Electoral history

Wisconsin Senate (1871)

| colspan="6" style="text-align:center;background-color: #e9e9e9;"| General Election, November 3, 1871

U.S. House of Representatives (1872)

| colspan="6" style="text-align:center;background-color: #e9e9e9;"| General Election, November 5, 1872

References

External links
 

Mayors of Green Bay, Wisconsin
Wisconsin state senators
People from Yates County, New York
1825 births
1883 deaths
19th-century American politicians